Discover Odin is an album and booklet written by Julian Cope and released in a limited edition in 2001. It was produced in collaboration with the British Museum as a companion CD programme to Cope's two nights of spoken word and music at the museum on 4–5 October 2001 in London. The album comprises a mixture of musical and spoken tracks.

In the first track, "The 18 Charms of Odin", Cope provides musical accompaniment to the text of the epic Norse poem Hávamál, in Kevin Crossley-Holland's version, as published in The Norse Myths.

The second track "Discover Odin" is Cope's spoken account of the alleged misinterpretation of the Norse myths by Roman historians and Christians, with comments on the religious traditions of Nordic cultures and their neolithic forebears. Cope suggests that Odin originated as a weather god and as the shaman Óðr.

Later tracks mix musical and spoken material on the subject of the Odin stone of Orkney, the neolithic hill of Silbury and the World Ash Tree, Yggdrasil.

The final track is a recording of a poem read by its author Vachel Lindsay (1879-1931).

The music ranges from ambient to psychedelic and space rock, especially when accompanied by Japanese psychedelic rock band Karuna Khyal on the track "Ode to Wan".

Track listing

Personnel 
Julian Cope – vocals, Mellotron, organ, guitar, bass
Thighpaulsandra – synthesizer, keyboards, trumpet on "Ode to Wan (Part 2)" 
Karuna Khyal – all music on "Ode to Wan (Part 1)" 
Terry Edwards – saxophone on "Discover Odin"
Donald Ross Skinner – drums on "Road to Yggdrasilbury"
Vachel Lindsay – vocal on "I want to go Wandering"

References

External links
Discover Odin on Discogs.com

2001 albums
Julian Cope albums
Norse mythology in music
Odin